Cow Head is a town in the Canadian province of Newfoundland and Labrador. The town had a population of 478 in the Canada 2016 Census.

The Dr. Henry N. Payne Community Museum (c. 1941) in Cow Head, Newfoundland and Labrador is on the Canadian Register of Historic Places.

Cow Head is home to one of the longest sandy beaches in Newfoundland as well as a large area of sand dunes. It also has panoramic views of the Long Range Mountains of Gros Morne. An interesting geologic feature found at Cow Head is a section of the former continental margin of Laurentia which dipped into the Iapetus ocean.

There is a walking trail leading to a lighthouse constructed in 1909 on the summer side or "head" of Cow Head.

Demographics 

Arts and culture 
Cow Head is the home to the Gros Morne Theatre Festival.

A new theatre named in honour of nurse, Myra Bennett, is currently under construction and aiming for completion in 2021.

Geology 
The Cow Head Group is made up of a series of continental slope strata that contain numerous boulders made of carbonate. These have yielded numerous trilobite fossils and have led to the identification of new species, including Catillicephala cifelli, named after paleontologist Rich Cifelli.

Gallery

See also 
List of lighthouses in Canada
List of cities and towns in Newfoundland and Labrador

References

External links 
Cow Head – Encyclopedia of Newfoundland and Labrador, vol. 1, p. 551-553.
 Aids to Navigation Canadian Coast Guard

Towns in Newfoundland and Labrador
Lighthouses in Newfoundland and Labrador